The SOCAN Songwriting Prize, formerly known as the ECHO Songwriting Prize, is an annual competition recognizing the best in Canadian emerging music, both anglophone and francophone.

Established in 2006, the competition was designed to recognize some of the most innovative, creative and artistic songs created in the year preceding the award by emerging songwriters in Canada.

Songs are selected by a competition panel composed of 10 music experts from the Canadian music scene, who each nominate two songs based on a set of criteria they believe are the best songs by emerging artists from the past year. The songs are narrowed down to a set of 10 finalists and announced publicly. Fans then vote for the winner over the course of two weeks in June. Once the winners (one anglophone and one francophone) are determined after the voting period, they each are awarded a $10,000 cash prize from SOCAN and an assortment of prizes from the yearly sponsors.

Beginning in 2015, the shortlist of nominees was increased from five to ten.

Award nominees and winners

References

External links
SOCAN Songwriting Prize

Music competitions in Canada
Canadian music awards
2006 establishments in Canada
Songwriting awards